Michael Kjeldsen (born 1962) is a retired male badminton player from Denmark. He is now 1st team coach in The elite club Måløv Badminton Club (MBC). MBC has started their season with two well played matches with Mister Kjeldsen as their coach.

Career
He won the bronze medal at the 1985 IBF World Championships in men's doubles with Mark Christensen. He won men's doubles at the European Badminton Championships in 1988 with Jens Peter Nierhoff.

Later life
Kjeldsen has been head coach of the elite teams in Måløv Badminton Club (MBC) since 2019.

Achievements

World Championships 
Men's doubles

World Cup 
Men's doubles

IBF World Grand Prix 
The World Badminton Grand Prix sanctioned by International Badminton Federation (IBF) from 1983 to 2006.

Men's singles

Men's doubles

References

badminton.dk
European results

Danish male badminton players
Living people
1962 births
Sportspeople from the Central Denmark Region